St. Joseph station, also known as St. Joseph–Benton Harbor station, is an Amtrak train station in St. Joseph, Michigan, United States, served by Amtrak's Pere Marquette line. It is located at 410½ Vine Street in St. Joseph opposite Silver Beach County Park. Since 2005 the station has shared the building with Silver Beach Pizza. In 1986 the Chesapeake & Ohio Railroad sold this station to the city of St. Joseph, Mi for $10,000. The station has a small waiting room with a self-service kiosk to purchase tickets.

References

External links 

St. Joseph-Benton Harbor Amtrak Station (USA RailGuide -- TrainWeb)

Amtrak stations in Michigan
Former Pere Marquette Railway stations
Railway stations in the United States opened in 1913
Buildings and structures in Berrien County, Michigan
Transportation in Berrien County, Michigan
1913 establishments in Michigan